Klaus Träumer (born 27 January 1940) is a German field hockey player. He competed in the men's tournament at the 1968 Summer Olympics.

References

External links
 

1940 births
Living people
German male field hockey players
Olympic field hockey players of East Germany
Field hockey players at the 1968 Summer Olympics
Sportspeople from Dresden